Henry Byrne was an Irish politician.

Henry Byrne may also refer to:

Henry Byrne (judge) (fl. 1810s), Puisne Justice of the Supreme Court of Ceylon
Henry Byrne (police officer), Irish police officer murdered in 1980

See also
Henry Burns (disambiguation)

Harry Byrne (disambiguation)
Henry de Burne, MP